The Capernaum Church (Danish: Kapernaumskirken ) is a Church of Denmark parish church located at Frederikssundsvej 45 in the North-West district of Copenhagen, Denmark. Inaugurated in 1895, it is the oldest surviving church built by the Copenhagen Church Foundation.

History
The church was built at the initiative of the Copenhagen Church Foundation (Danish: Kirkefondet). It was built in 1894-05 to design by Valdemar Koch.

Architecture
The church is built from red brick and has a saddle roof topped by a ridge turret. The facade to Frederikssundsvej has round-arched windows, a Lombard band and a relief of an angel above the main entrance.

Parish
As of 1 January 2012, the parish had 9,029 inhabitants of which 5,148 (57.02 %) were members of the Church of Denmark.

References

External links
 Official website

Churches in Bispebjerg
Lutheran churches in Copenhagen
19th-century Church of Denmark churches
Churches completed in 1895
Churches in the Diocese of Copenhagen